The 2006 Biathlon Junior World Championships was held in Presque Isle, United States from January 28 to February 3, 2006. There was to be a total of 16 competitions: sprint, pursuit, individual, mass start, and relay races for men and women.

Medal winners

Youth Women

Junior Women

Youth Men

Junior Men

Medal table

References

External links
Official IBU website 

Biathlon Junior World Championships
2006 in biathlon
2006 in American sports
International sports competitions hosted by the United States
2006 in youth sport
Multisports in the United States